Graux may refer to:

People
Charles Graux (politician), a Belgian professor, linguist, lawyer, and politician
Charles Graux (classicist), a French classicist

Other
Graux, Wallonia, a district of the municipality of Mettet in Belgium
Graux, West Virginia, an unincorporated community in Roane County